Abraham Ruhumuriza (born 28 August 1979) is a Rwandan former cyclist. His main success was in the Tour du Rwanda, which he won five times between 2002 and 2007.

Major results

2002
 1st Overall Tour du Rwanda
2003
 1st Overall Tour du Rwanda
2004
 1st Overall Tour du Rwanda
2005
 1st Overall Tour du Rwanda
2007
 1st Overall Tour du Rwanda
 7th Road race, African Road Championships
2008
 1st Stage 5 Tour du Rwanda
2009
 1st Overall Kwita Izina Cycling Tour
 5th Overall Tour du Rwanda
2010
 1st Overall Kwita Izina Cycling Tour
 7th Overall Tour du Cameroun
1st Stages 4 & 7
2011
 3rd Road race, National Road Championships
 5th Overall Tour du Rwanda
2012
 1st Overall Kwita Izina Cycling Tour
1st Stage 2
2015
 3rd Road race, National Road Championships
 6th Overall Tour du Cameroun
2016
 10th Overall Tour de Côte d'Ivoire

References

External links

 
 
 

1979 births
Living people
Rwandan male cyclists